Elections were held to elect the borough presidents of New York City on November 5, 1901. Fusionists and Republicans won three of the city's five boroughs while Democrats were returned in The Bronx and Queens.

Notes

References

Borough President elections
Elections 1901
New York City borough president
Borough president
New York City borough president
New York City borough president elections